Kailahun District is a district in the Eastern Province of Sierra Leone. Its capital and largest city is the town of Kailahun. The second most populous city in the district is Segbwema. Other major towns in Kailahun District include Koindu, Pendembu and Daru. As of the 2015 census, the district had a population of 525,372. Kailahun District is subdivided into fourteen chiefdoms.

The District of Kailahun borders Kenema District to the west, Kono District to the north, the Republic of Liberia to the east, and the Republic of Guinea to the north. The border of the district with Guinea is formed by a section of the Moa River. The population of Kailahun District is largely from the Mende ethnic group, though there are other ethnic groups with significant population in the district, including among them the Kissi, Mandingo and the Fula. 
 
The major economic activities in the district are farming, diamond mining and trade. The large majority of the people of Kailahun District are Muslims, though with a significant Christian minority.

Kailahun District is a political stronghold of the Sierra Leone People's Party (SLPP), the current ruling party in Sierra Leone. Since Sierra Leone"s Independence in 1961 to present, the overwhelming majority of the people of Kailahun Districts support the Sierra Leone People's Party (SLPP). Kailahun District is the birthplace of former Sierra Leone's president Ahmad Tejan Kabbah, who was born in the town of Pendembu.

Government and politics
Kailahun District is governed with a district council form of government, which is headed by a District Council Chairman, who is chief executive officer in the District and is responsible for the general management of the district. The District Council Chairman is elected directly by the residents of the district of Kailahun every four years. The current chairman of Kailahun district council is  Sahr Ahmed Lamin of the Sierra Leone People's Party (SLPP), who easily won the 2018 District Chairperson election with an overwhelming landslide victory

Kailahun District is a reliable political stronghold of the Sierra Leone People's Party (SLPP), the current ruling party in Sierra Leone. The District overwhelmingly supports the SLPP by a large majority in Presidential, Parliamentary and local councils elections. The SLPP have won every Sierra leone president elections in the District by over 73%; including the 2018 Presidential election, when the SLPP candidate Julius Maada Bio  won 89% of the votes in the District.

Radio 
Radio Moa FM 105.5 Kailahun SLBC 95.1, Radio Kissi Bendu FM 107.3 Koindu

Demographics of Kailahun District
The vast majority of the people  of Kailahun District are ethnic Mende. However, Kailaun District is home to a significant minority of Mandingo, Kissi, Fula, Gola and Vai. The Vai, Kissi and Gola make up the majority of the population in the villages and small towns in Kailahun District at the international border with the Republic of Liberia.

Economy
Kailahun has a mixed economy, made up of small-scale mining as well as agricultural production of coffee, cacao and rice. Local Government collects property taxes with the assistance of Revenue Development Foundation

Administrative divisions

Chiefdoms

The district is made up of fourteen chiefdoms as the third level of administrative subdivision.

Dea – Baiwala
Jaluahun – Segbwema
Jawei – Daru
Kissi Kama – Dea
Kissi Teng – Kangama
Kissi Tongi – Buedu
Luawa – Kailahun
Malema – Jojoima
Mandu – Mobai
Peje Bongre – Manowa
Peje West – Bunumbu
Penguia – Sandar
Upper Bambara – Pendembu
Yawei – Bandajuma

Major towns
Segbwema, largest city
Kailahun, district headquarters
Pendembu, second largest town
Koindu, fourth largest
Daru

Notable people from Kailahun District
Ahmad Tejan Kabbah, former President of Sierra Leone
Steady Bongo, Sierra Leonean musician
Hindowa Momoh, former President of the National Union of Sierra Leone Students
Robin Faley, Sierra Leonean politician, representative for Segbwema
 Ibrahim Sheriff, Founder, Sherix Webradio and Philanthropist
 Moinina Conteh, JP, Master Farmer and former Member of Parliament for SLPP
 Stephen Vandy Lansana, Senior Journalist of Premier Media Group Ltd 

 Hon. Maigore Kallon, former chairman of the SLPP, former MP, former minister of Foreign affairs and international cooperation.

References

External links
 "Kailahun District" at cocsl.com
 https://web.archive.org/web/20070121122533/http://www.statehouse-sl.org/member-parliament.html

Kailahun
Eastern Province, Sierra Leone